The National Association for Research & Therapy of Homosexuality (NARTH), also known as the NARTH Institute, is a US organization that promotes conversion therapy, a pseudoscientific practice used in attempts to change the sexual orientation of people with same-sex attraction.  NARTH was founded in 1992 by Joseph Nicolosi, Benjamin Kaufman, and  Charles Socarides. Its headquarters were in Encino, California, at its Thomas Aquinas Psychological Clinic. It has operated under the name Alliance for Therapeutic Choice and Scientific Integrity (ATCSI) since 2014. NARTH is not recognized by any major United States-based professional association.

NARTH's promotion of conversion therapy as a scientifically supported therapeutic method is contradicted by overwhelming scientific consensus. For example, the American Psychological Association (APA) states that homosexuality is a normal and positive variation of human sexual orientation, and is not a mental disorder. The APA's Task Force on Appropriate Therapeutic Responses to Sexual Orientation affirms the tension between some religious values and other organizations and the existence of a subset of individuals who are distressed about their same-sex attraction, but it says it has not found adequately rigorous studies that suggest sexual orientation change efforts are successful. The APA Task Force has also found that some individuals reported being harmed by sexual orientation change efforts.

History 

NARTH was founded in 1992 by Benjamin Kaufman, Charles Socarides, and Joseph Nicolosi. In an article titled "In Defense of the Need for Honest Dialogue", Kaufman wrote that the three of them founded NARTH because the American Psychiatric Association and similar professional organizations "had totally stifled the scientific inquiry that would be necessary to stimulate a discussion" about homosexuality.

The organization had 501(c)(3) tax exempt status, which was revoked by the Internal Revenue Service in September 2012 due to ongoing failure to file required paperwork.

Activities 

NARTH claimed to be a secular organization, differentiating it from other ex-gay groups that were primarily religious in nature. Nevertheless, NARTH often partnered with religious groups, such as Jews Offering New Alternatives for Healing, Joel 2:25 International, and Evergreen International in Positive Alternatives to Homosexuality.

In July 2011, NARTH failed to pay its dues to the California Board for Behavioral Sciences and was removed from the list of groups that provide continuing education credits to therapists in California. NARTH had been an approved continuing education provider since 1998.

No schools, universities or professional programs currently train counselors in reparative therapy.

Affiliations 
NARTH had several connections to Evergreen International and the Church of Jesus Christ of Latter-day Saints. The Evergreen website referenced the therapeutic methods of NARTH founder Joseph Nicolosi as "beneficial". Nicolosi worked with A. Dean Byrd (an Evergreen Board member, Director of Clinical Training for LDS Social Services, and Brigham Young University professor) to author several papers on reparative therapy. Byrd also served as president of NARTH and also published an article in the LDS church's September 1999 Ensign.

In 2003, the leaders of Positive Alternatives to Homosexuality (PATH) made NARTH a member.

Controversy

Stances on the etiology and mutability of homosexuality

The founders held that homosexuality is a treatable mental illness and that a person's sexual orientation can be changed through therapy. Such conversion therapy is pseudoscientific, harmful, and unethical according to major medical and psychological organisations in the United States and elsewhere. Socarides in particular said in the mid-1990s that he had treated about a thousand homosexual patients, and cured over a third by dealing with the parental causes of an absent father and overbearing mother.

Claims that pathologize homosexuality and state that it can be changed through therapy have been denounced by almost every major US medical association, including the American Medical Association and the American Psychiatric Association. In 2006 the American Psychological Association declared that NARTH created "an environment in which prejudice and discrimination can flourish". The Southern Poverty Law Center (SPLC) singled the group out as a main source of junk science used by hate groups to justify anti-gay rhetoric. NARTH was accused of employing abusive methods to attempt to change sexual orientation by the Human Rights Campaign and Truth Wins Out.

Abba Goldberg
In 2010, NARTH’s executive secretary Abba Goldberg disclosed a 1991 criminal conviction for conspiracy and fraud, for which he served 18 months in prison.

George Rekers
George Rekers was a former officer and scientific advisor of the NARTH. Rekers has testified in court that homosexuality is destructive, and against parenthood by gay and lesbian people in a number of court cases involving organizations and state agencies working with children. In May 2010 Rekers employed a male prostitute as a travel companion for a two-week vacation in Europe. Rekers denied any inappropriate conduct and suggestions that he was gay. The male escort told CNN he had given Rekers "sexual massages" while traveling together in Europe. Rekers subsequently resigned from the board of NARTH.

Gerald Schoenewolf
In April 2005, NARTH published on its website an essay titled "Gay Rights and Political Correctness: A Brief History", written by Gerald Schoenewolf, a member of NARTH's Science Advisory Committee.  The essay made several controversial claims, including that the civil rights and gay rights movements are "destructive", that the American Psychological Association "has been taken over by extremist gays", and that Africans were fortunate to have been sold into slavery. The SPLC called it an angry polemic that made outrageous historical claims and criticised both NARTH and Schoenewolf. The essay drew little attention until a letter of protest was presented to NARTH by the National Black Justice Coalition in mid-September 2006.  Truth Wins Out then called on Focus on the Family to cancel a planned appearance by Nicolosi at their conference.  Nicolosi appeared as planned but the Schoenewolf essay was removed from the NARTH website the same day.  On October 6, 2006, NARTH published a statement: "NARTH regrets the comments made by Dr. Schoenewolf about slavery which have been misconstrued by some of our readers."

See also 

 Biology and sexual orientation
 Environment and sexual orientation
 Homosexuality and psychology

References

External links 
 The Alliance for Therapeutic Choice and Scientific Integrity, Official Website
COPP Position Statement on Therapies Focused on Attempts to Change Sexual Orientation (Reparative or Conversion Therapies)

Conversion therapy organizations
Non-profit organizations based in California
Organizations established in 1992
Organizations that oppose LGBT rights in the United States